Memorial Private School is a private life and college prep school for grades 6-12 in the Memorial area of Houston, Texas. Opened in 2004, the school was established by Harry and Pam Camp, who respectively originated from the Sharpstown and Spring Branch communities.. A leading innovator in research-based education, Memorial Private School works closely with top companies and universities. Accredited by the Southern Association of Colleges and Schools (SACS).

References

External links
 Memorial Private High School

Christian schools in Houston
Private high schools in Houston
Private middle schools in Texas
2005 establishments in Texas
Educational institutions established in 2005